Pentahydroxyflavone may refer to:

 Hypolaetin (3',4',5,7,8-pentahydroxyflavone)
 Quercetin (3,5,7,3',4'-pentahydroxyflavone) 
 Tricetin (5,7,3',4',5'-pentahydroxyflavone)